The Insider is the final book of the science fiction literary cycle Empire of Weia by Russian writer Yulia Latynina.

This novel was published in 1999 in Olma-Press (Russia). The story takes place on another planet in a feudal empire, which began to interact with the highly developed civilization on Earth.

Main characters
 Terence Bemish - the finance adventurer and greenmailer from Federation of Nineteen on the Earth
 Kissur — the barbarian leader and the Emperor's favorite
 Shavash — the finance vice-minister of Empire

Publish
  9000 copies.
  10000 copies.
  5000 copies.

Awards
ABC Award from Arkady and Boris Strugatsky in 2000. Boris Strugatsky said: "It's the new type of the novels".

Reviews
 Reviews (in Russian)

External links
 Yulia Latynina. The Insider (in English)
 Yulia Latynina. The Insider (in Russian)

References

1999 novels
1999 science fiction novels
Russian science fiction novels